The 1995–96 BBL season was known as the Budweiser League for sponsorship reasons. The league featured a total of 13 teams, playing 36 games each. The division retained the same thirteen teams as the previous year after the BBL rejected an application from Crystal Palace who had sealed the National League Division One (the second tier) title. The main change saw the Sunderland Scorpions renamed the Newcastle Comets due to a change of franchise and venue, their new home would be in Gateshead until the newly built Newcastle Arena opened on 18 November. The Manchester Giants also had a new home at the Nynex Arena and the sport was boosted by the return of TV coverage by Sky Sports.

London Towers clinched a treble, winning the National Cup, 7 Up Trophy and finishing top of the regular season standings. They were defeated in the Championship Play-off final by Birmingham Bullets.

Budweiser League Championship (Tier 1)

Final standings

The play-offs

Quarter-finals 
(1) London Towers vs. (8) Thames Valley Tigers

(2) Sheffield Sharks vs. (7) Worthing Bears

(3) Birmingham Bullets vs. (6) Derby Storm

(4) Leopards vs. (5) Manchester Giants

Semi-finals

Final

National League Division 1 (Tier 2)

Final standings 

One point deducted *

Sainsbury's Classic Cola National Cup

Fourth round

Quarter-finals

Semi-finals

Final

7 Up Trophy

Group stage 
Northern Group
Southern Group

Chester finished ahead of Doncaster by having the best head-to-head record between the teams. London, Manchester, Sheffield and Thames Valley all received a bye into Quarter-finals.

Quarter-finals 
Chester Jets vs. Birmingham Bullets

Manchester Giants vs. Sheffield Sharks

Thames Valley Tigers vs. London Towers

Worthing Bears vs. Derby Storm

Semi-finals 
London Towers vs. Birmingham Bullets

Worthing Bears vs. Sheffield Sharks

Final

Seasonal awards 

 Most Valuable Player: Tony Dorsey (Birmingham Bullets)
 Coach of the Year: Kevin Cadle (London Towers)
 All-Star Team:
 Tony Dorsey (Birmingham Bullets)
 Karl Brown (Leopards)
 Steve Bucknall (London Towers)
 Todd Cauthorn (Sheffield Sharks)
 Roger Huggins (Sheffield Sharks)
 LaKeith Humphrey (Derby Storm)
 Colin Irish (Worthing Bears)
 Danny Lewis (London Towers)
 Mark Robinson (Manchester Giants)
 Tony Windless (London Towers)

References 

British Basketball League seasons
1
British